Natalia Carolina Campos Fernández (born 12 January 1992) is a Chilean footballer who plays as a goalkeeper for Club Universidad de Chile and the Chile women's national team.

International career
Campos made her senior debut for Chile during the 2014 Copa América Femenina in a 0–2 loss to Brazil on 19 September. She is the second choice for the Chilean goal after team captain Christiane Endler.

References 

1992 births
Living people
People from Santiago Province, Chile
Chilean women's footballers
Women's association football goalkeepers
Club Deportivo Universidad Católica footballers
Fundación Albacete players
Segunda Federación (women) players
Chile women's international footballers
2019 FIFA Women's World Cup players
Chilean expatriate women's footballers
Chilean expatriate sportspeople in Spain
Expatriate women's footballers in Spain
Footballers at the 2020 Summer Olympics
Olympic footballers of Chile